Thokozani Khupe (born 18 November 1963) is a Zimbabwean politician, trade unionist and the President of the MDC-T breakaway faction of the Movement for Democratic Change (MDC). She was Deputy Prime Minister 2009–13.

Following the death of party founder Morgan Tsvangirai in early 2018 Khupe opposed the ascent of Nelson Chamisa as leader of the MDC-T on the grounds that she was the only one of its three Vice Presidents elected by congress, whereas Chamisa and the third vice president Elias Mudzuri had been appointed by Tsvangirai. Khupe was supported by much of the party organization in this, but lost the power struggle to Chamisa; Khupe and her supporters consider their faction the legitimate MDC-T and have continued to use the MDC-T name. They are involved in a court battle with the Chamisa faction over the party name, symbols, logo and trademark; the matter had not been resolved prior to the 2018 general elections and the Khupe faction ran in the elections as the MDC-T while the much bigger Chamisa faction ran as part of the MDC Alliance.

On 22 April 2018, she was elected unopposed as the President of her MDC-T faction at an extraordinary congress in Bulawayo.

In 2020 she was removed from the position of party president by Douglas Mwonzora amid strong claims of violence and cheating from her fans.

Education 
Born in Bulawayo, Khupe graduated in 1999 from the Turin Centre in Turin, Italy, with a certificate in Information Technology. She also holds a Bachelor of Arts in Media Studies from the Zimbabwe Open University, Master of Business Administration, MBA from the National University of Science and Technology, and a PhD in Social Studies from the University of Zimbabwe.

Trade union politics 
She served as an official of the Zimbabwe Amalgamated Railway Union (ZARU) in 1987. In 1991 she was elected Secretary of the ZCTU Women's Advisory Council and also became a member of the General Council of the ZCTU. In 1999 she participated in the formation of the Movement for Democratic Change party, in which she was elected as a National Executive member responsible for Transport, Logistics and Welfare.

Political career 
In June 2000, Khupe was elected as the Member of Parliament for Makokoba Constituency in Bulawayo.

She was a member of the Budget, Finance and Economic Development Committee; and on Youth Development, Gender and Employment Creation Committee and was elected Vice Chairperson of the Women's Parliamentary Caucus and became Parliamentary Deputy Chief Whip of the MDC. She retained the constituency in the March 2005 parliamentary election. She is in the Parliamentary Portfolio Committee of Defense, Home Affairs and National Security and that of Budget, Finance and Economic Development.

In the March 2008 parliamentary election, Khupe ran for re-election in Makokoba constituency as the candidate of the MDC-Tsvangirai faction, defeating Welshman Ncube, the Secretary-General of the MDC-Mutambara faction. She received 4,123 votes against 2,475 votes for Ncube.

She was for several years an active member of the African Parliamentary Network against Corruption.

Khupe was Deputy Prime Minister of Zimbabwe from 11 February 2009 to August 2013 in the government of national unity between the MDC-T and ZANU-PF. She was a Member of Parliament for Makokoba constituency before being recalled by her party in 2018 on the grounds that she no longer represented the party's interests.

In 2005 she was elected vice-president of the Movement for Democratic Change (MDC) taking over from veteran trade unionist Gibson Sibanda.

One of her close allies in the Senate of Zimbabwe was Mildred Reason Dube.

In March 2022, Khuphe urged Zimbabweans to vote for Chamisa's Citizens Coalition for Change in that month's by-election.

Electoral history

References

External links

The official site is http://www.mdc.co.zw, but it may harm visitors' computers with trojan software.

1963 births
Living people
Citizens Coalition for Change politicians
People from Bulawayo
Northern Ndebele people
Deputy Prime Ministers of Zimbabwe
Movement for Democratic Change – Tsvangirai politicians
Members of the National Assembly of Zimbabwe
Zimbabwe Open University alumni
University of Zimbabwe alumni
21st-century Zimbabwean women politicians
21st-century Zimbabwean politicians
Women government ministers of Zimbabwe